Ernsting is a German surname. Notable people with the surname include:

John Ernsting (1928–2009), British Royal Air Force commander
Walter Ernsting (1920–2005), German writer

See also
Nadine Ernsting-Krienke (born 1974), German field hockey player
15265 Ernsting, a main-belt asteroid

German-language surnames